Arthur William Tilley (6 March 1892 – 1984) was an English professional footballer who played in the Football League for Clapton Orient as an outside right.

Personal life 
Tilley served as a private with the 1st Football Battalion of the Middlesex Regiment during the First World War. He was discharged from the army in July 1916.

References

English footballers
English Football League players
Association football outside forwards
Peterborough & Fletton United F.C. players
Leyton Orient F.C. players
Lincoln City F.C. players
1892 births
People from Wellingborough
1984 deaths
British Army personnel of World War I
Middlesex Regiment soldiers
Rugby Town F.C. players
Date of death missing
Place of death missing
Military personnel from Northamptonshire